Blida is a district in Blida Province, Algeria. It was named after its capital, Blida, which is also the capital of the province. It is the most populous district in the province.

Municipalities
The district is further divided into 2 municipalities:
Blida
Bouarfa

Notable people

 Mhamed Yazid (1923-2003), politician
 Mahfoud Nahnah (1942-2003), politician
  (1893-1976), theologian
  (1941-1993), politician

Districts of Blida Province